Khlong Pla Kot railway station is a railway station located in Thap Krit Subdistrict, Chumsaeng District, Nakhon Sawan. It is located 270.873 km from Bangkok railway station and is a class 3 railway station. It is on the Northern Line of the State Railway of Thailand.

Train services
 Ordinary 201/202 Bangkok-Phitsanulok-Bangkok
 Ordinary 211/212 Bangkok-Taphan Hin-Bangkok
 Local 401/402 Lop Buri-Phitsanulok-Lop Buri
 Local 407/408 Nakhon Sawan-Chiang Mai-Nakhon Sawan

References 
 Ichirō, Kakizaki (2010). Ōkoku no tetsuro: tai tetsudō no rekishi. Kyōto: Kyōtodaigakugakujutsushuppankai. 
 Otohiro, Watanabe (2013). Tai kokutetsu yonsenkiro no tabi: shasō fūkei kanzen kiroku. Tōkyō: Bungeisha. 

Railway stations in Thailand